Medmerry Mill is a grade II listed tower mill at Selsey, Sussex, England which has been restored and is used as a shop.

History

Medmerry Mill was built circa 1827, replacing an earlier post mill and was working by wind until 1890. After falling into disrepair, the mill was refitted by Holloway of Shoreham in 1907–08. The mill was working until the early 1920s. The mill was derelict by 1928, with all four sails badly damaged. The fanstage was removed in 1960 during the restoration of the mill. In 1987, the mill was badly damaged, but the sails were later restored.

Description

Medmerry Mill was built as a five-storey mill, driving two pairs of millstones. Holloway's completely refitted the mill in 1908, resulting in a four-storey brick tower mill with a domed cap which was winded by a  fantail. It has four Patent sails carried on a cast iron Windshaft. The Brake Wheel is iron.

Millers

William Reeves 1783 (post mill)
H R Arnell 1858 - 1878
Sampson Copstake
F W Sharpe 1882 - 1890
Farne and Co. 1905 - 1920s

References for above:-

References

External links
Windmill World Page on Polegate windmill.

Further reading
 no longer Online version

Towers completed in 1827
Industrial buildings completed in 1827
Tower mills in the United Kingdom
Grinding mills in the United Kingdom
Tourist attractions in West Sussex
Grade II listed buildings in West Sussex
Windmills in West Sussex
1827 establishments in England
Selsey